Angkatan Belia Islam Malaysia (ABIM) or the Muslim Youth Movement of Malaysia is an Islamic organisation founded on 6 August 1971 by Ustaz Wahab Sulaiman.

History
ABIM was established by Ustaz Wahab Sulaiman on 6 August 1971 during an international trend of Islamic revivalism. Founded by Muslim students, PKPIM (National Union of Malaysian Muslim Students) in particular, the organisation promoted Islam through its charity work and education programs aimed at the poor. Yayasan Anda, a private school known as the "Institute", served as a centre for its promotion of Islamic education. The popularity of the organisation was aided by widespread scepticism among the youth towards secularisation and Westernisation. ABIM supported and assisted Islamic students practising Dawah, the preaching of Islam, and was a crucial organisation in the early stages of the Malaysian dawah movement. According to Bubalo and Fealy, ABIM was inspired and influenced by the Muslim Brotherhood, which the authors describe as both a socio-political movement and intellectual tendency or current within Islamism.
	
The group reached its height during the late 1970s with a call to return to the basics and the true teachings of Islam through advocacy channel. In the 1980s decade, ABIM renewed its approach through the concept of "partnership in nation building" with the government. The idea that also was known as "the reform from within" had undergone the highly successful period particularly when the idea of establishing Islamic University and Islamic Banking that derived originally form ABIM's Annual General Assembly had been realised through the establishment of International Islamic University of Malaysia-IIUM (1982) and Bank Islam Malaysia Berhad (1983). For an organisation that was nominally not political, ABIM consistently criticised the government particularly in the scope of good governance which is non-compliance with Islamic principle. By 1986, the group had 40,000 members and now reaching 60,000 members and ABIM's mission continuously received encouraging support from Muslims in Malaysia.

List of presidents of ABIM
 Razali Nawawi (1971–1974)
 Anwar Ibrahim (1974–1982)
 Siddiq Fadzil (1983–1991)
 Mohd Nor Monutty (1991–1997)
 Ahmad Azam Abdul Rahman (1997–2005)
 Yusri Mohamad (2005–2009)
 Muhamad Razak Idris (2009–2011)
 Amidi Abdul Manan (2011–2015)
 Mohamad Raimi Abdul Rahim (2015–2019)
 Muhammad Faisal Abdul Aziz (2019–present)

See also
 Islam in Malaysia

References

External links
 

1971 establishments in Malaysia
Islamic organizations established in 1971
Islamic organisations based in Malaysia
Youth organisations based in Malaysia
Non-profit organisations based in Malaysia
Political advocacy groups in Malaysia
Islamism in Malaysia
Islamist groups
Muslim Brotherhood